Şafak Pekdemir (born 19 June 1988) is a Turkish actress.

Early life and education
Şafak Pekdemir was born on 19 June 1988 in Istanbul, Turkey. She is a graduate of Beykent University Faculty of Fine Arts.

Career
Before starting her acting career she made her debut in short film Sadist in 2009. In 2010, she started her acting career and made her debut in the series Türk Malı depicting the character of Zehra. In 2011, she appeared in the TV series Firar, in the same year she portrayed the character of Asıl Demircan in the series Süphe which starred Selin Demiratar, Serkan Altunorak and İsmail Hacıoğlu. In 2012, she depicted the character of Nisan in the series Leyla ve Mecnun, in 2014 she appeared in the movie İncir Reçeli 2 portraying the character of Gizem. In 2015, she appeared in the series Asla Vazgeçmem and depicted the character of İclal. In 2017, she made her debut in the movie Deli Aşk portraying the character of Zeynep, the next year she had a leading role in the movie Deniz ve Güneş. In 2018, she made her debut on the series Yasak Elma portraying the character of Zehra Argun, the daughter of Halit Argun (portrayed by Talat Bulut). The show was broadcast on FOX and starred Şevval Sam, Eda Ece and Nesrin Cavadzade. She has a main role in the series, which is one of the most highly rated shows on air in Turkey.

Personal life
Pekdemir married Burak Mengü, the son of Şahin Mengü and the brother of Nevşin Mengü in December 2017. The couple reportedly separated in August 2018.

Filmography

Theatre

References

External links
 
 

Living people
1988 births
Actresses from Istanbul
Turkish television actresses
Turkish film actresses
21st-century Turkish actresses